The 1996 NCAA Division I Indoor Track and Field Championships were contested to determine the individual and team national champions of men's and women's NCAA collegiate indoor track and field events in the United States after the 1995–96 season, the 32nd annual meet for men and 14th annual meet for women.

The championships were again held at the RCA Dome in Indianapolis, Indiana.

George Mason claimed the men's team title, the Patriots' first. This was the first men's championship since 1983 not won by Arkansas.

Three-time defending champions LSU again won the women's team title, the Lady Tigers' seventh.

Qualification
All teams and athletes from Division I indoor track and field programs were eligible to compete for this year's individual and team titles.

Team standings 
 Note: Top 10 only
 Scoring: 6 points for a 1st-place finish in an event, 4 points for 2nd, 3 points for 3rd, 2 points for 4th, and 1 point for 5th
 (DC) = Defending Champions

Men's title
 60 teams scored at least one point

Women's title
 53 teams scored at least one point

References

NCAA Indoor Track and Field Championships
Ncaa Indoor Track And Field Championships
Ncaa Indoor Track And Field Championships